Proposta per Eivissa (PxE) is a political coalition formed in Ibiza in 2018. It was created ahead of the 2019 Balearic election and the 2019 local elections as an electoral alliance formed by Proposal for the Isles (El Pi), More Ibiza (Más Eivissa) and Insular Alternative (AL–in).

Composition

References

Political parties in the Balearic Islands
Political parties established in 2019